Alberto Toscano (born 1 January 1977) is an Italian cultural critic, social theorist, philosopher, and translator. He has translated the work of Alain Badiou, including Badiou's The Century and Logics of Worlds. He served as both editor and translator of Badiou's Theoretical Writings and On Beckett.

Work
Toscano's own work has been described both as an investigation of the persistence of the idea of communism in contemporary thought and a genealogical inquiry into the concept of fanaticism. He is the author of The Theatre of Production (2006), and his book Fanaticism: The Uses of an Idea was published in 2010. Toscano has published on contemporary philosophy, politics and social theory. In an  article on the Tarnac 9 case, written for The Guardian in December 2009, Toscano argues that society is losing its ability to distinguish between vandalism and terrorism.

A reader in sociology at Goldsmiths, University of London, Toscano is a member of the editorial board of the journal Historical Materialism: Research in Critical Marxist Theory. According to Alex Callinicos this journal "has been one of the main drivers of the academic revival of Marxism"  since the mid-1990s.

Selected bibliography
Translated books
Alain Badiou, Logics of Worlds, London: Continuum, 2009. 
Alain Badiou, The Century, London: Polity, 2007. 
(with M. Mandarini) Antonio Negri, Political Descartes: Reason, Ideology and the Bourgeois Project, London: Verso, 2007. 
Alain Badiou, Handbook of Inaesthetics, Stanford: Stanford University Press, 2004. 
(with Ray Brassier), Alain Badiou, Theoretical Writings, London: Continuum, 2004.
(with E.R. Albert), Éric Alliez, The Signature of the World, Or, What is Deleuze and Guattari's Philosophy?, London: Continuum, 2004.
(with Nina Power), Alain Badiou, On Beckett, London: Clinamen Press, 2003.

Authored books
Theatre of Production: Philosophy and Individuation between Kant and Deleuze, Basingstoke: Palgrave, 2006.
Fanaticism: The Uses of an Idea, New York: Verso, 2010. Le Fanatisme. Modes d'emploi, La fabrique, 2011 (FR).
Cartographies of the Absolute, with Jeff Kinkle, Winchester, UK: Zero Books, 2015.

Film appearances
 Marx Reloaded, ZDF/Arte, April 2011.

See also
 Speculative realism

References

External links
Toscano's Faculty Homepage at Goldsmiths, University of London website
Rethinking Marxism and Religion, an essay Toscano published at the website: Bienvenue sur le site du séminaire Marx au XXIe siècle 
Toscano's Author Page at Institute for the Unstable Media
Communist knowledge/Communist power – transcript of Toscano's paper delivered on day two of the Birkbeck Communism conference in London, March 2009
Dual Power Revisited: From Civil War to Biopolitical Islam essay which appeared in the journal Soft Target; this is the on-line version
Chronicles of Insurrection - Tronti, Negri and the Subject of Antagonism an on-line reprint of an essay by Toscano first published in Cosmos and History 5.1 (2009)

Living people
British philosophers
Social philosophers
British sociologists
French–English translators
Marxist theorists
1977 births